Eddie DeLange (né Edgar DeLange Moss; 15 January 1904 – 15 July 1949) was an American bandleader and lyricist. Famous artists who recorded some of DeLange's songs include Frank Sinatra, Ella Fitzgerald, Louis Armstrong, Nat King Cole, Duke Ellington, and Benny Goodman.

Biography
DeLange was born in Long Island City, Queens, New York. He graduated from the University of Pennsylvania in 1926. He became a stunt man in twenty-four comedies produced by Universal Studios, often for Reginald Denny.

DeLange went back to New York City in 1932, earning a contract with Irving Mills. He had several hits in his first year, including "Moonglow."

He and composer Will Hudson (né Arthur Murray Hainer; 1908–1981) formed the Hudson-DeLange Orchestra in 1935. The Orchestra recorded many of their collaborative songs and did many road shows as well. Hudson and DeLange's partnership dissolved in 1938, but DeLange created a new band that played on several tours. He formed a new partnership with another composer, Jimmy Van Heusen, and together they produced a large number of hits, including "Darn That Dream". In 1942, De Lange co-wrote "A String of Pearls", a successful number for Glenn Miller.

Eddie DeLange died in Los Angeles, California, on 15 July 1949. He is interred at Glendale's Forest Lawn Memorial Park in an unmarked grave.

The National Academy of Popular Music's Songwriters Hall of Fame inducted him into their ranks in 1989.

Family 
DeLange, in 1943, married Marge Lohden (née Margaret Mary Lohden; 1918–1990). He moved with her to Los Angeles. They had two children, Stephanie Barr DeLange (born 1944) and Warren Edgar DeLange (born 1945). Eddie DeLange lived the rest of his life in Los Angeles, writing music for motion pictures.

References

External links

 Official Eddie DeLange Website
 Eddie DeLange on Songwriters Hall of Fame site

American bandleaders
Big band bandleaders
Songwriters from New York (state)
Broadway composers and lyricists
1904 births
1949 deaths
Burials at Forest Lawn Memorial Park (Glendale)
20th-century American musicians
American conductors (music)
American male conductors (music)
20th-century American male musicians
American male songwriters